The Southcote Baronetcy, of Bliborough in the County of Lincoln, was a title in the Baronetage of England. It was created on 24 December 1661 for George Southcote. The title became extinct upon the death of the second Baronet in 1691.

Origins

Capt. Thomas Southcot (1608-1657) was an officer of the Cavalier Army during the First English Civil War, the early part of the English Civil War. In 1644 he was the garrison commander of the Cavalier army based at Calstock and Cotehele. He defended Cornwall from Robert Devereux, 3rd Earl of Essex and his Parliamentarian forces.

Thomas Southcot died in 1657, never witnessing the restoration of the monarchy in 1661. King Charles II did recognise Thomas's tremendous loyalty by awarding his only son George Southcote (1629-1663) with the title of Baronet of Bliborough.

Capt. Thomas Southcot's father was Sir George Southcote MP (1572-1638), he was a very wealthy landowner having four estates. At his death he divided his four estates between his three sons. Firstly his eldest son, George Southcote received the estate of Stoke Fleming and Blyborough. His Second Son Capt. Thomas Southcot received only the estate of Withycombe. His third son, Robert Southcote, received the estate in Shillingford. Upon George Southcote's death his left his entire estate to his only son Thomas Southcote MP DL JP. However Thomas Southcote had only one daughter Lady Elizabeth Portman. In the year leading up to his death he gave both of his estates to his cousin George Southcote (1629-1663). This is George Southcote inherited his estate in Blyborough and how he later became Baronet of Bliborough.

Southcote baronets, of Blyborough (1662)
Sir George Southcote, 1st Baronet (1629–1663)
Sir George Southcote, 2nd Baronet (1664–1689)

The first Baronet married Catherine Eliot, daughter of John Elliot Esq of Essex, becoming the first baronetess. They had one son named George, he was born four months after his father's death. The second Baronet died without any sons, he left  two  infant  daughters,  afterwards  married  to Smith  and  Fitzherbert.

Family Tree

Claim
The title of Baronet of Southcote was claimed after Sir George's deaths in 1689. Claimed by the eldest son of Michael Southcote. However he died without issue, his youngers brother Henry and Phillip are supposed  to  be  the  only  male  descendants  of  the  family. It is unknown if they continued to claim the title.

References
 

 

Southcott family
Extinct baronetcies in the Baronetage of England
1662 establishments in England